Gerald J. LaValle (January 25, 1932 – September 12, 2018) was an American politician who was a member of the Democratic Party in the Pennsylvania State Senate.

Biography
A native of Beaver County, Pennsylvania, he earned a degree from Geneva College in 1956 and a Master of Education from Westminster College in New Wilmington, Pennsylvania in 1971. He worked as a teacher, guidance counselor, and athletic coach at Midland High School and Rochester Area High School from 1959 to 1984.

He served in the borough government of Rochester, Pennsylvania, as councilman from 1973 to 1976 and mayor from 1976 to 1988. He then served as County Commissioner of Beaver County. He was elected to represent the 47th senatorial district in the Pennsylvania Senate in a 1990 special election. Within the Democratic caucus, he was elected Minority Caucus Secretary in 2005 and Minority Appropriations Committee Chairman on February 6, 2007.

In 2007 and 2008, LaValle was investigated by the Pennsylvania Attorney General for his connections to two separate Beaver County non-profit organizations. The Beaver Initiative for Growth, an $11 million community development nonprofit founded by LaValle and State Representative Mike Veon, was implicated for loose financial management. The second, the Voluntary Action Center, was a small nonprofit call center partially funded by the Beaver Initiative for Growth and operated by LaValle's wife, Darla LaValle.

Investigations into the Voluntary Action Center began when Darla LaValle repaid the organization about $50,000 in "unauthorized compensation." On August 18, 2008, Pennsylvania Attorney General Tom Corbett charged LaValle's wife, Darla LaValle, with stealing thousands of dollars, inflating her salary, and denying employees pension benefits while serving as executive director of the Voluntary Action Center.

He retired following the 2008 Pennsylvania Senate elections.

Death
LaValle died on September 12, 2018 at the age of 86.

References

External links

Biography, voting record, and interest group ratings at Project Vote Smart
2006 2004 2002 2000 Campaign contributions (at Follow the Money)

1932 births
2018 deaths
Democratic Party Pennsylvania state senators
Mayors of places in Pennsylvania
Pennsylvania city council members
People from Rochester, Pennsylvania
Military personnel from Pennsylvania
Geneva College alumni
Westminster College (Pennsylvania) alumni
United States Marine Corps officers
Educators from Pennsylvania
Beaver County Commissioners (Pennsylvania)